David John Madden (1880 – 31 July 1955) was an Irish Fine Gael politician, farmer and auctioneer. He was elected to Seanad Éireann in April 1938 by the Industrial and Commercial Panel. He was re-elected to the Seanad in July 1938, 1943 and 1944. 

He was elected to Dáil Éireann as a Fine Gael Teachta Dála (TD) for the Limerick West constituency at the 1948 general election. He was re-elected at the 1951 and 1954 general elections. He died in office in 1955 during the 15th Dáil; the resulting by-election, held on 13 December 1955, was won by Michael Colbert of Fianna Fáil.

References

1880 births
1955 deaths
Fine Gael TDs
Members of the 2nd Seanad
Members of the 3rd Seanad
Members of the 4th Seanad
Members of the 5th Seanad
Members of the 13th Dáil
Members of the 14th Dáil
Members of the 15th Dáil
Irish farmers
Politicians from County Limerick
Fine Gael senators